Frascineto is a town and comune in the province of Cosenza in the Calabria region of southern Italy. It is home to an Arbëresh minority.

Notable people
Vincenzo Dorsa Arbëresh scholar, writer and translator

See also
San Pietro, Frascineto

References

External links
 Official website
 Video on http://www.telecosenza.it

Arbëresh settlements
Cities and towns in Calabria